The American Indoor Soccer League was a semi-professional indoor soccer league founded in 2002 and folded in 2008.

History 
Founded in 2002, the AISL's headquarters were in West Springfield, Massachusetts, but the media relations office was in Cleveland, Ohio. The 2005–06 season started with promise, starting with six teams, but the New Mexico Storm and Detroit-Windsor Border Stars decided not to play in the AISL just before the season got under way. In 2006, the league announced the membership of the Canton Crusaders, but the team's membership was revoked after the ownership was unable to fulfill its financial obligations.

In 2008 with the Cincinnati Excite going on hiatus, and the Massachusetts Twisters and Rockford Rampage moving to the National Indoor Soccer League, the 2008–09 campaign was canceled. On December 23, 2008, all news stories were dropped from the website.

Rules
Like many other indoor soccer leagues, the AISL also had their own variations on the generally-followed indoor soccer rules. Some of these variations were:
A point system that consisted of 1, 2, and 3 point goals, depending on how far away from the net the shot was taken.
No three lines rule.
One timeout per half per team.
 Similar to the MSL, a goalkeeper could "...not use his hands when team-mate passes the ball back. Only after a shot from the opposing team, can you pass back to the keepers hands inside your third line. ( Rebounds, etc...) No direct pass back to keeper outside the third of field to hands."
The clock did not stop unless the ball went out of play in the last two minutes of the fourth quarter.

Teams

Previous champions

Notable names 
Connally Edozien formerly of the Nigeria national football team's youth system and New England Revolution. Edozien has played in the USL with the Rochester Raging Rhinos and is on contract with the Carolina RailHawks FC.
Oscar Albuquerque current owner of the Rockford Thunder franchise played for Canada's 1980 Olympic qualifying team and in the National Professional Soccer League.
Dayton O'Brien formerly with the University of Memphis, O'Brien was drafted by the Columbus Crew in 2006. O'Brien signed with the Memphis Mojo for the 2006/2007 season.
Everson Maciel of the Western Mass Pioneers signed with the Massachusetts Twisters for the 2006/2007 season after good season in the USL Second Division earned Maciel a spot on the USL 2 All League Team.
Michael Todd of the New York Surf was selected by the Kansas City Wizards in the first round of the 2007 MLS Supplemental Draft.
Gary Flood of the New York Surf was also selected in the 2007 Supplemental but in the second round by the New England Revolution.

See also
Major Indoor Soccer League (MISL)

References

 
Defunct indoor soccer leagues in the United States
2002 establishments in the United States
2008 disestablishments in the United States
2002 in American soccer leagues
2003 in American soccer leagues
2004 in American soccer leagues
2005 in American soccer leagues
2006 in American soccer leagues
2007 in American soccer leagues